Elen Yeremyan (born 27 May 2001), known professionally as Brunette, is an Armenian singer-songwriter. She will represent Armenia at the Eurovision Song Contest 2023.

Career  
Brunette has been singing since the age of four and writing music since the age of fifteen.

Brunette released her debut single "Love the Way You Feel" at the age of 18 in collaboration with Nvak Foundation in September 2019. She later became a member of Project 12, a Yerevan-based musical collective performing at night clubs. Brunette is also a member of the girl group En aghjiknery (ThoseGirlz), which is known for the 2022 single "Menq". In 2022, Brunette released the singles "Gisher", "Smoke Break" and "Bac kapuyt achqerd"; the latter of the two went viral on social media.

On 1 February 2023, it was announced that Brunette was internally chosen to represent Armenia in the Eurovision Song Contest 2023. Her Eurovision song "Future Lover" was released on 15 March 2023.

Discography

Singles

References

External links 
 Brunette at eurovision.tv

Living people
Armenian musicians
Armenian pop musicians
2001 births
Eurovision Song Contest entrants for Armenia
Eurovision Song Contest entrants of 2023
21st-century Armenian women singers